Novoplotava is a rural locality (a settlement) in Michurinsky Selsoviet, Khabarsky District, Altai Krai, Russia. The population was 277 as of 2013. It was founded in 1786. There are 4 streets.

Geography 
Novoplotava is located 28 km southeast of Khabary (the district's administrative centre) by road. Michurinskoye is the nearest rural locality.

References 

Rural localities in Khabarsky District